Clepsis celsana is a species of moth of the family Tortricidae. It is found in Russia, Kazakhstan and Xinjiang, China.

References

Moths described in 1919
Clepsis